Joel Keith Mann (August 1, 1780 – August 28, 1857) was an American politician from Pennsylvania who served as a Jacksonian member of the U.S. House of Representatives from 1831 to 1835.

Early life
Mann was born in Cheltenham Township, Pennsylvania to Samuel M. and Margaret Keith Mann.  He was educated in the common schools and worked as a farmer.

Career
He was a member of the Pennsylvania House of Representatives from 1817 to 1820.  He served in the Pennsylvania State Senate for the 3rd district from 1824 to 1829.

Mann was elected as a Jacksonian to the Twenty-second and Twenty-third Congresses.  He served as chairman of the United States House Committee on Accounts during the Twenty-third Congress.  He resumed agricultural pursuits and died in Jenkintown, Pennsylvania.  Interment in the Abington Presbyterian Church Cemetery in Abington, Pennsylvania.

Notes

Sources

The Political Graveyard

Pennsylvania state senators
Members of the Pennsylvania House of Representatives
1780 births
1857 deaths
People from Montgomery County, Pennsylvania
People from Cheltenham, Pennsylvania
Jacksonian members of the United States House of Representatives from Pennsylvania
19th-century American politicians